California's 44th State Assembly district is one of 80 California State Assembly districts. It is currently represented by Democrat Jacqui Irwin of Thousand Oaks.

District profile 
The district is located on the South Coast, encompassing the outer western suburbs of Los Angeles and nearby communities. It is anchored by Oxnard in the west and Thousand Oaks in the east.

Los Angeles County – 0.1%
 Westlake Village

Ventura County – 55.1%
 Camarillo
 Moorpark
 Oak Park
 Oxnard – 78.9%
 Port Hueneme
 Thousand Oaks

Election results from statewide races

List of Assembly Members 
Due to redistricting, the 44th district has been moved around different parts of the state. The current iteration resulted from the 2011 redistricting by the California Citizens Redistricting Commission.

Election results 1992 - present

2020

2018

2016

2014

2012

2010

2008

2006

2004

2002

2000

1998

1996

1994

1992

See also 
 California State Assembly
 California State Assembly districts
 Districts in California

References

External links 
 District map from the California Citizens Redistricting Commission

44
Government of Los Angeles County, California
Government of Ventura County, California
Santa Monica Mountains
Simi Hills
Camarillo, California
Moorpark, California
Newbury Park, California
Oak Park, California
Oxnard, California
Thousand Oaks, California
Westlake Village, California